Palaquium fidjiense is a tree in the family Sapotaceae.

Description
Its timber is locally harvested.

Distribution and habitat
Palaquium fidjiense is endemic to Fiji, where it is known from the islands of Viti Levu, Vanua Levu, Kadavu, Ovalau and Waya.

References

fidjiense
Endemic flora of Fiji
Plants described in 1909